The Sacred Heart School System is a private college preparatory school system of Roman Catholic denomination in Kingston, Massachusetts.  The schools are located in the Roman Catholic Archdiocese of Boston.  The school system is operated by the Sisters of Divine Providence and has been educating students in grades 7-12 since its establishment in 1947. It more recently developed into grades PreK-12, and is now made up of three schools, an elementary school, a pre-primary (kindergarten) school, and an Intermediate and High School. Masses are held monthly and on special occasions in either the high school auditorium or in the high school chapel.

The three schools, a summer camp, and the Provincial Residence are also located on the extensive campus. Sacred Heart has  won numerous regional and national recognitions for visual and performing arts. The school paper, The Heart Beat, has also achieved regional and international recognition.

In the 2018-2019 school year the Catholic order spent $2.2 million to keep the high school open, but after that time no longer had the money to do so. In 2020 the school system announced that its high school division would close.

Notes and references

External links
Official High School Site
Official Elementary School Site
Livejournal Community

Catholic secondary schools in Massachusetts
Kingston, Massachusetts
Private middle schools in Massachusetts
Congregation of Divine Providence